The Creighton–Nebraska men's basketball rivalry is an intrastate college basketball rivalry between the Nebraska Cornhuskers and Creighton Bluejays. The two programs represent the University of Nebraska–Lincoln and Creighton University, located just 50 miles apart.

Nebraska is a member of the Big Ten Conference and Creighton is a member of the Big East Conference. The teams have met annually since 1977, usually in the early part of December.

Series history
The series began on March 3, 1923, a 46–23 Creighton victory. The first seven games of the series took place sporadically throughout the 1920s and 1930s; no further games were scheduled until the late 1970s. Since 1977, Nebraska and Creighton have met at least once annually, a stretch of 43 consecutive seasons. The schools have met twice in postseason tournaments, both Nebraska wins in the opening round of the 1984 and 2004 NIT.

Since Creighton has not had a football program since 1942, there are a significant number of Creighton basketball fans who also support Nebraska's football program. These fans are often derisively referred to by Nebraska fans as "Jayskers," a portmanteau of "Bluejays" and "Cornhuskers."

Game results

References

College basketball rivalries in the United States
Nebraska Cornhuskers men's basketball
Creighton Bluejays men's basketball